Jonathan Edwards Ryland (5 May 1798 – 16 April 1866) was an English man of letters and tutor.

Life
The only son of John Ryland (1753–1825), by his second wife, he was born at Northampton on 5 May 1798. His early years were spent in Bristol, and he was educated at the Baptist college, over which his father presided, and at the University of Edinburgh, where he was a pupil of Dr Thomas Brown.

For a time he was mathematical and classical tutor at Mill Hill College, and for a short period he taught at Bradford College. He later moved to Bristol, and in 1835 went to Northampton, where he remained for the rest of his life. The degree of MA was in 1852 conferred upon him by Brown University, Rhode Island.

He died at Waterloo, Northampton, on 16 April 1866. On 4 January 1828 he had married Frances, daughter of John Buxton of Northampton.

Works
Ryland mostly edited and translated the works of others. His earliest compositions were inserted in The Visitor (Bristol, 1823); he was a writer in the Baptist Magazine, and he edited vols. ix.–xii. of the fifth series of the Eclectic Review.

He wrote for John Kitto's Cyclopædia of Biblical Literature, and he published in 1856 a "Memoir" of Kitto. In 1864 he produced Wholesome Words; or One Hundred Choice Passages from Old Authors. To the eighth edition of the Encyclopædia Britannica he contributed memoirs of John Foster, Andrew Fuller, Kitto, Robert Robinson, Schleiermacher, and Schwartz, and the articles "Northampton" and "Northamptonshire".

Translations by Ryland included Blaise Pascal's Thoughts on Religion, Bernard Jacobi on the General Epistle of St. James, Felix Neff's Dialogues on Sin and Salvation, Ernst Sartorius's Lectures on Christ, Karl Gottlieb Semisch's Life of Justin Martyr, François Gaussen's Canon of the Holy Scriptures, August Tholuck's Guido and Julius and Old Testament and the New, Christian Gottlob Barth's Weaver of Quelbrunn, Johann Peter Lange's Life of Christ (vol. ii.), two treatises by Ernst Wilhelm Hengstenberg, and several volumes by Augustus Neander on the History of the Church and its Dogmas.

Ryland edited the Pastoral Memorials of his father (1826–8), and the Life and Correspondence of John Foster (1846, 2 vols.) He also edited collections of Foster's Essays and Lectures.

References

Attribution

1798 births
1866 deaths
English writers
English translators
Dissenting academy tutors
English male non-fiction writers
19th-century British translators
19th-century English male writers